Prove You Wrong is an album by American heavy metal band Prong, released in 1991. It is their only album with Troy Gregory on bass guitar. The album includes a cover of "(Get A) Grip (On Yourself)", originally by The Stranglers.

Prove You Wrong continued the experimentation with groove metal that began on Prong's previous album Beg to Differ, toning down much of the hardcore punk elements from their 1980s output in favor of a more experimental sound that was influenced by alternative, thrash metal, funk, progressive and industrial music.

Critical reception
Entertainment Weekly wrote that Prong "combines postindustrial noise, a rebellious punk mentality, and heavy-metal flourishes and, with a minimalist approach that is anything but simplistic, strips them all down to a brutal essence." Trouser Press wrote: "While the trio’s devotion to precisely lurching rhythms keeps the songs choppy — a clenched fist twitching spasmodically as it prepares to deliver a haymaker — this dull record makes that attribute part of a tentative shift toward industrial anti-musicality."

Track listing
"Irrelevant Thoughts" – 2:37 (Parsons, Victor)
"Unconditional" – 4:45 (Troy Gregory, Victor)
"Positively Blind" – 2:43 (Victor)
"Prove You Wrong" – 3:31 (Gregory, Victor)
"Hell If I Could" – 4:00 (Gregory, Victor)
"Pointless" – 3:07 (Prong)
"Contradictions" – 4:10 (Victor)
"Torn Between" – 3:11 (Gregory, Victor)
"Brainwave" – 3:01 (Victor)
"Territorial Rites" – 3:31 (Prong)
"(Get A) Grip (On Yourself)" – 3:05 (Hugh Cornwell) (The Stranglers cover)
"Shouldn't Have Bothered" – 2:39 (Victor)
"No Way to Deny It" – 4:41 (Victor)

Personnel

Prong
Tommy Victor – lead vocals, lead and rhythm guitars
Troy Gregory – bass guitar, backing vocals
Ted Parsons – drums, percussion, backing vocals
Mark Dodson – additional vocals

Production
Prong – arrangers
Mark Dodson – arranger, producer, engineer, mixing
Brooke Hendricks – engineer, assistant engineer
Brian Stover – assistant engineer
Greg Calbi – mastering
Roger Lomas – mastering

References

Prong (band) albums
1991 albums
Epic Records albums
Albums produced by Mark Dodson